KN Academy was established by the Khalil Nanitalwala Educational Society as a non-profit organization dedicated to the cause of providing a quality education. The family of Khalil Bhai (Khalil Nanitalwala) donated Rs100 million to set up  KN Academy. KN Academy is a private school and is co-educational.

It was established in 2000 as KN Academy “Main Campus” and renewed as the “International Campus” in 2016.

The KN Academy International Campus is spread over an area of more than 26 acres in Karachi, Pakistan. It is a boarding school with an option for day students. It offers classes for primary to senior grades.

Currently, it follows the Cambridge System.

Academics 

KN Academy is an "English Medium School". Applicants to the academy must pass an interview and a written test.

KN Academy also offers classes covering the curriculum of Cambridge University.

Miscellany 
In a 2019 interview, Neha Tanwar said that she practiced at KN Academy because her coach, Dinesh Rai, then not having an academy of his own, worked with the institution.

As part of the rewards for the crowning of the 2020 Miss Teenager South Africa (which was postponed due to the COVID-19 pandemic), the winner would receive a one-year-long mentorship program from KN Academy.

In February 2020, Syed Murad Ali Shah said that the road to KN Academy should be reconstructed.

References 

Schools in Karachi
Boarding schools in Pakistan
International schools in Pakistan